Martin Delaney may refer to:

 Martin Delaney (activist) (1945–2009), HIV/AIDS treatment advocate
 Martin Delaney (actor), British actor

See also
 Martin Delany (1812–1885), African-American abolitionist